Athletics New Zealand (ANZ) is the national governing body for athletics in New Zealand. This includes responsibility for Track and field, cross country running, road running and racewalking.

History
The organisation was founded in 1887 as the New Zealand Amateur Athletic Association (NZAAA). The first national championships were held the following year in 1888.  In 1989, the current name was adopted.

Structure 
There are 11 regional athletics associations supporting 179 clubs with approximately 22,000 registered members including athletes, coaches and volunteers.

Affiliations
ANZ is the national member federation for New Zealand in the following international organisations:
World Athletics
Oceania Athletic Association (OAA)
Athletics New Zealand is part of the following national organisations:
New Zealand Olympic Committee

National records 
ANZ maintains the New Zealand records in athletics.

See also
Sport in New Zealand
Sport and Recreation New Zealand

References
ATHLETICS–TRACK AND FIELD - 1966 Encyclopaedia of New Zealand

External links

New Zealand
1887 establishments in New Zealand
Sports governing bodies in New Zealand
Athletics in New Zealand
National governing bodies for athletics
Sports organizations established in 1887